Maimai may refer to:

People
Mai Hagiwara (born 1996), member of °C-ute
Mai Oshima (born 1987), Japanese singer
Mai-Mai Sze (1909–1992), painter and writer, translator of the Jieziyuan Huazhuan into English

Other uses
Mai-Mai, a type of militia in the Democratic Republic of the Congo
Maay Maay, a variety of Somali language sometimes written as Mai Mai and spoken in Somalia, Ethiopia, and Kenya
Maimai (video game), a rhythm arcade game by Sega
Mai Mai Miracle, a Japanese animated film
Maimai Wanwan Rural LLG, a local-level government area of Sandaun Province, Papua New Guinea
HMNZS Maimai, a New Zealand naval vessel
Maimai or mai-mai, a type of blind or hide used for wildfowl hunting in New Zealand (see Mia-mia, below)
Maimai languages, a branch of Torricelli languages spoken in northern Papua New Guinea
Mai mai, a Mapuche greeting

See also
Mia-mia, a temporary shelter
Miami, a city in Florida
Mama (disambiguation)
Meow Meow (disambiguation)